Eden Primary School may refer to:

Eden Primary School, Carrickfergus, Carrickfergus, County Antrim, Northern Ireland
Eden Primary School, Ballymoney, Ballymoney, County Antrim, Northern Ireland
Eden Primary School, Haringey, Jewish state school